Alexandros Tanidis (born 23 October 1992) is a former professional footballer who played as a centre-back.

References

1991 births
Living people
People from Dachau
Sportspeople from Upper Bavaria
Greek footballers
Association football central defenders
SV Austria Salzburg players
TSV 1860 Munich II players
SV Heimstetten players
SC Victoria Hamburg players
Lüneburger SK Hansa players
SG Wattenscheid 09 players
Becamex Binh Duong FC players
PSMS Medan players
Greek expatriate footballers
Greek expatriate sportspeople in Vietnam
Expatriate footballers in Vietnam
Greek expatriate sportspeople in Indonesia
Expatriate footballers in Indonesia
Footballers from Bavaria
German footballers
German expatriate footballers
German expatriate sportspeople in Indonesia
German expatriate sportspeople in Vietnam
German people of Greek descent
Greek expatriate sportspeople in Austria
German expatriate sportspeople in Austria
Expatriate footballers in Austria